Construction partnering is a type of business partnering used in the architecture, engineering and construction industry.  Partnering is intended to assist project teams with setting goals, resolving disputes and improving project outcomes.  The construction partnering team is made up of the project’s owner (client), the consulting engineers and/or architects, the contractor(s) and other key project stakeholders. Construction partnering has been used both in the United States and elsewhere since the early 1980s as a methodology to reduce litigation and improve productivity.

Objective
The objective of construction partnering is to reduce project costs and schedules, eliminate change orders and claims, and improve communication by developing mutually agreed upon project and partnership success goals and by monitoring the achievement of these goals for the duration of the project. The construction partnering team will also develop an agreed upon process for resolving disputes should they arise, called a dispute resolution ladder.

History
Litigation in the construction industry exploded in the 1980s.  Settling disputes in court added time, cost and energy to projects.  Partnering was developed as a response to this problem.

In 1987, the Construction Industry Institute (CII) at The University of Texas at Austin formed a task force to explore a process to address the issues that brought the people involved in construction projects to litigation.  The task force’s objectives were to examine the risks and benefits of partnering, to provide guidelines on the process and to define the relationship between partnering and the construction contract.  Their results were published in January 1991 entitled, “In Search of Partnering Excellence.”

The United States Army Corps of Engineers (Corps) was part of the CII task force.  In the late 1980s the Corps used the partnering process on two of their construction projects with great success.  As a result, the Corps established a partnering program in 1991.  They developed a pamphlet which described the partnering process, the reasons for using it, and the potential benefits of partnering the Corps had experienced in using the process.

The Associated General Contractors of America (AGC) endorsed partnering in January 1991. AGC’s president announced that one of AGC’s objectives for the year was building construction quality through partnering.  They later developed an annual award, the Marvin M. Black Award, to honor the AGC contractor(s) involved in the year’s most collaborative project.

In the past 30 years, partnering has grown.  Twenty-four of the 50 state transportation programs have adopted Partnering as an important process to improve outcomes.  Several state transportation departments (including Caltrans, Maryland SHA, ODOT, ADOT and others) now require a partnering process by specification.

Awards
Construction partnering has been embraced by the construction industry to such an extent that organizations have started offering awards to the top partnered projects.  The current awards available are:

AGC’s Marvin M. Black Partnering Competition  (https://web.archive.org/web/20141013112037/http://www.agc.org/cs/about_agc/recognition_programs/marvin_m_black_partnering_awards)
AGC’s Excellence in Partnering Award (https://web.archive.org/web/20141015013431/http://www.agc-ca.org/about.aspx?id=60)
Arizona Transportation’s Partnering Excellence Awards https://www.azdot.gov/business/programs-and-partnerships/partnering/2013-arizona-transportation-partnering-excellence-awards
Caltrans’ Excellence in Partnering  (http://www.dot.ca.gov/hq/construc/partnering.php)
International Partnering Institute’s Annual Partnering Awards http://partneringinstitute.org/awards/
Kansas Department of Transportation’s KCA/KDOT Partnering Awards http://www.ksdot.org/bureaus/divoperat/partnering/awards.asp
Nevada Department of Transportation’s Excellence in Partnering Awards https://web.archive.org/web/20141022055048/http://www.nevadadot.com/Doing_Business/Partnering_Program.aspx
Ohio DOT’s Don Conway Partnering Award (http://www.dot.state.oh.us/Divisions/ConstructionMgt/Pages/Partnering.aspx)

References

Construction industry